The Woodlands College Park High School is a high school in The Woodlands, CDP area of Montgomery County, Texas in the United States. It is operated by the Conroe Independent School District (CISD), and is one of the six main high schools in the district.

Opened in the fall of 2005, it enrolls students from grades 9 to 12. The school operates on a seven period day and in some cases, offers zero and eighth hour periods before and after school, respectively. College Park is also home to the Conroe ISD Academy of Science and Technology, a science and technology based magnet program.

In addition to sections of The Woodlands, it serves portions of Shenandoah.

History
It opened in August 2005, and had a cost of $80 million. The Academy of Science and Technology, previously housed at Oak Ridge High School, moved to College Park when College Park opened, since Oak Ridge needed more space for its zoned students. College Park had grades 9 through 11 in its first year, with grade 12 being established the following year. As the school opened, prospective incoming students were given the choice of remaining at The Woodlands High School, or going to College Park.

Campus
The three story school building has  of space. There is a main entrance with four pillars and a clock tower on top and separate gymnasium and auditorium entrances. Carissa D. Mire of the Houston Chronicle stated that the clock tower is similar to the one in Back to the Future.

Academics
The Woodlands College Park High School has achieved high academic ratings since it opened in 2005, including exemplary ratings from the Texas Education Agency.  The 2017, U.S. News & World Report listed the high school in the top 100 of all Texas High Schools (including magnet and charter schools) which places it in the top 5% overall.  Additionally, the 2017 Texas school rankings from the Children at Risk organization rated the school an A+ and a ranking of 23 out of 187 Houston area high schools and 9 out of 141 when excluding dedicated charter and magnet schools.  An average SAT score of 1657 places College Park among the top high schools in the Houston area.

For each school year, the Texas Education Agency rates school performance using an A–F grading system based on statistical data. For 2018–2019, the school received a score of 92 out of 100, resulting in an A grade. The school received a similar score of 90 the previous year.

Athletics

College Park's mascot is the Cavalier. College Park Cavaliers competes in football, baseball, basketball (boys and girls), track (boys and girls), cross county (boys and girls), soccer (boys and girls), wrestling (boys and girls), softball, tennis (boys and girls), golf (boys and girls), volleyball, and bowling. They once had a hockey team, but the school disbanded it in 2010.

Various programs have seen statewide success over the years; College Park's football team went undefeated in the 2007 regular season, and had a state-ranked defense in the 2013 season. The tennis team has been state-ranked multiple times. The boys basketball team was nationally-ranked in 2013 and went to state, but lost to the also nationally-ranked Atascocita High School. The Cavaliers bowling team won state in 2013. Boys soccer was nationally ranked and went to state in 2019, but lost the state championship against soccer powerhouse Lee High School. The women's cross county team competed in the state championships in 2007, 2008, 2009, 2010, 2011, 2012, 2013, 2014, 2015, 2016, 2017, and 2018, placing in the top 15 all 12 years. The women's volleyball team, who went state-ranked in 2010, 2011, 2014, 2016, 2017, 2018, and 2019, and were within the top 25 teams nationally in 2011. 

The school's hockey team used a rink at Bear Branch Park from 2008 to 2010.

Demographics
In the 2018–2019 school year, TWCP had 3,127 students. The ethnic distribution of students was as follows:
 52.3% were White
 26.6% were Hispanic
 9.1% were Asian
 8.1% were Black
 3.1% were Two or More Races
 0.6% were American Indian
 0.3% were Pacific Islander

19.0% of students were eligible for free or reduced-price lunch.

Feeder patterns
Elementary schools (K-4) that feed into the Woodlands College Park High School include David Elementary, Hailey Elementary, Lamar Elementary, Houser Elementary (Zone 58 Only), Buckalew Elementary(apartments on FM 1488 only), Powell Elementary (Harper's Landing and Alden Woods only), and Ride Elementary.

Intermediate schools (5-6) include Collins Intermediate and Wilkerson Intermediate (excluding the Glen Loch ES zoning area).

All Knox Junior High School students feed into College Park. The Academy of Science and Technology brings in students from The Woodlands High School, Oak Ridge High School and College Park feeder zones.

Notable alumni
 Trey Diller — former NFL player
 Quentin Grimes — NBA player
 Alexander Myres — NFL player
 Austin Pruitt — MLB player
 Parker McCollum — Americana and country singer and songwriter

References

External links

 The Woodlands College Park High School
 The Academy of Science and Technology

Conroe Independent School District high schools
Educational institutions established in 2005
2005 establishments in Texas
The Woodlands, Texas